Nohl is a German surname. Notable people with the surname include:

 Karsten Nohl (born 1981), German cryptography expert and hacker
 Ludwig Nohl (1831–1885), German music scholar and writer
 Mary Nohl (1914–2001), American artist

German-language surnames